Camp Celo is a privately owned Quaker-based summer camp for children aged 7–12 located in Celo Community of Yancey County, North Carolina.

Program
Camp Celo offers a junior camp (for children ages 7–10) and a senior camp (ages 11 and 12). Activities include camping, hiking, swimming, gardening, animal care, arts & crafts, wood shop, and field games. The camp operates a swimming hole on the South Toe River. Campers help maintain an organic garden and farm animals.  Senior campers participate in extensive backpacking trips in the nearby Black Mountains, Linville Gorge Wilderness, Wilson Creek Wilderness, and on the Appalachian Trail. The camp serves approximately 35 junior campers and 27 senior campers per session. About 325 campers attend each summer.

History
Founded by Doug and Ruby Moody in 1948, Camp Celo has been operating under the current ownership of the Barrus/Perrin family since 1955.

Philosophy
Camp Celo has been noted for its stances on a number of social issues, including racial integration, gender equality, nonviolence, and environmentalism. Much of its philosophy and traditions are based upon Quaker tradition.

See also
Arthur Morgan School
Celo Community

References

External links
Camp Celo Homepage
Camp Celo Official Facebook Page
Friends of Camp Celo Webpage

Quakerism in the United States
Quakerism in North Carolina
Celo
Yancey County, North Carolina